Noblesville Airport (I80) is a privately owned, public use airport located in Noblesville, Indiana. The airport has a single turf runway that is 3580 ft × 100 ft. This airport has 24 single-engine airplanes and, on average, sees 134 flights per week.

References

Airports in Indiana